Refugees in Hong Kong have formed historic waves arriving in the city due to wars in the region and Hong Kong's historical role as a trading and transit entrepôt. More recently those seeking asylum or protection based on torture claims are a fast growing part of the city's population, increasing since 2004 due to changes in the legal system for considering asylum and torture claims mandated by local courts.

As of September 2017, there were about 14,000 pending or failed asylum seekers or torture claimants awaiting processing, adjudication, appeals, or deportation after failure to gain refugee status. With roughly 60% from South Asia, 30% from Southeast Asia, and nearly 10% from Africa.

Almost none of the asylum seekers or torture claimants are ultimately sustained by immigration authorities and judicial review to have a bona fide claim and granted refugee status or protection in Hong Kong. A public debate surrounds the asylum system with criticism voiced from some sectors of the press and political spectrum about the high cost of supporting the living expenses of the asylum seekers and torture claimants, process abuse by those seeking asylum and protection who are without a bona fide claim to fear of torture or persecution, and the crime committed by applicants who typically wait for years to have claims adjudicated.

Definitions
A refugee is a person holding refugee status based on the Convention Relating to the Status of Refugees. An asylum seeker is a person claiming to be a refugee but who has not had his or her status determined in the prospective country. A torture claimant is a person claiming protection in the prospective country from being returned to another state where there are "substantial grounds for believing that he or she would be in danger of being subjected to torture" according to the United Nations Convention against Torture.

History

From Maoist China

During the Maoist era, the leading reason for Chinese refugees in Hong Kong was fleeing persecution, hunger and political turnmoil. The end of the Chinese Civil War in 1949 resulted in the population growing from 600,000 to 2.1 million between 1945 and 1951, meaning a large proportion of the Hong Kong population are descended from refugees. The total of Chinese refugees entering British Hong Kong from 1950 through 1963 is about 1,160,000.

From Russia

Included amongst this wave were also thousands of Russian refugees who had migrated from mainland China through Hong Kong during the 1950s and 1960s. These were White Russians who had fled the Soviet Union after the Communist Revolution in 1917 and settled in Manchuria and Sinkiang, but had to flee again after the Communists assumed control of China in 1949. For more than two decades they were stranded, billeted in hotels with their expenses shared by the UNHCR and the World Council of Churches waiting for resettlement by UNHCR in countries including the United States, Brazil, Argentina, Australia and New Zealand. It is estimated that by 1980 a total of twenty thousand White Russians from mainland China had passed through Hong Kong on their way to resettlement in overseas destinations.

From Vietnam

In the next wave, the end of the Vietnam War brought hundreds of thousands of Vietnamese refugees. Ultimately, of the refugee claims, 143,700 Vietnamese refugees were resettled in third countries while about 67,000 Vietnamese migrants were deported back to Vietnam. Only about 1,000 Vietnamese refugees were granted permission to reside and assimilate in Hong Kong.

Court rulings
Since 2004 after a series of rulings by Hong Kong courts prohibited the immigration authority in Hong Kong from removal of any illegal immigrants as long as those individuals claimed persecution or risk of torture and awaited adjudication of their claims. There was a dramatic increase in the number of asylum seekers and torture claimants after 2004.

A March 2013 holding by the Court of Final Appeal held that determination of refugee claims is subject to judicial review. This landmark holding prompted Hong Kong to restructure the system for considering claims into a Unified Screening Mechanism in 2014.

In the period from 2014–15, the number of asylum seeker claims has soared, rising by 70% from early 2014 to mid-2015 due to consolidation of claims for both persecution and torture under the Unified Screening Mechanism.

Unified Screening Mechanism
Since 2014, the system for consideration of asylum and torture claims in Hong Kong is implemented under the common umbrella of the Unified Screening Mechanism and administrated by the Department of Immigration. By commencing this mechanism UNHCR has ceased the screening of asylum claims under its mandate in Hong Kong  and the two processes are no longer to be handled separately by the UNHCR considering asylum seekers who claimed risk of persecution and the Hong Kong government assessing claims of torture risk. Rejection of claims made by the department is subject to appeal before Hong Kong courts. Whereas in other countries successful applications result in lawful residence, successful applications in Hong Kong mean only that people will not be returned to their countries of origin (non-refoulement). They are not given any form of lawful residence and can only apply for six-month permits to work, granted at the discretion of the Director of Immigration.

Process abuse
The official government position as stated by an Immigration Department spokesperson in 2012 is Hong Kong has a "long-established policy of not granting asylum and we do not admit individuals seeking refugee status" citing fears that asylum seekers would abuse the system given the prosperity of the city's economy and liberal visa policy.

The rate of success of torture claims is extremely low. By 2013, the Torture Claim Assessment Section by the Immigration Department assessed 4532 claims, of which only 12 were sustained as substantiated. As of June 2019 172 of 21,553 claims were substantiated. This 0.8 substantiation rate extremely low compared to rates of 25-62% per cent in other developed jurisdictions. There have been complaints about the competency of decision making after reports of judges relying on Wikipedia for information about the claimant's country of origin, and  refusing to adjourn proceedings even when the claimant was suffering from pregnancy-induced pain. The 2013 Annual Report of the Immigration Department notes that most torture claims are filed after either the claimant has been arrested for contravening Hong Kong law, notified of their removal from Hong Kong, or has had their claim for refugee status rejected by the United Nations High Commissioner for Refugees.

The South China Morning Post has noted that some asylum seekers are motivated to make claims to illegally work in Hong Kong for years, which is the length of time it can take to process claims.

Demographics
As of September 2017, there are about 14,000 asylum seekers awaiting determination of their claims. Over half of the asylum seekers are from the following three South Asian countries: Pakistan, India, and Bangladesh, with nearly a third from Southeast Asia and 10% from Africa.

Asylum seekers live in low cost housing due to the basic level of rental subsidy provided by the Hong Kong government and extremely high cost of rent in the city. The monthly rent allowance per adult in June 2019 being $1,500 HKD (US$190), and a food budget in the form of food vouchers of $40HKD a day. The centrally located Chungking Mansions is a popular living quarter for asylum seekers who find budget accommodation in the 15 floor residential block that is home also to foreign wholesale goods traders and backpackers. Outside of the city center, asylum seekers also live in the rural villages of Hong Kong where cheaper accommodation is found. In some reporting cases having to live in converted pig and chicken shacks.

Cost and assistance
The total cost of assistance to asylum seekers in the 2013–14 fiscal year was HK$450 million (about US$60 million). The government provides a $1,500HKD (US$190) a month rental subsidy, food and emergency medical care to asylum seekers who are not allowed to work while claims are considered. Food coupons worth $1200HKD are provided every month, although the remittances are tiny considering the extremely high cost of living in the city. Publicly funded legal representation is provided for asylum seekers that are unable to afford hiring a lawyer. Although with the very low acceptance rate of legal aid applications most asylum seekers are forced to represent themselves unless they can persuade the very over stretched legal organisations such as Justice Centre Hong Kong and lawyers willing to carry out pro-bono legal assistance.

The high cost of supporting asylum seekers was a reason for a proposal by the Liberal Party in 2015 to withdraw visa free entry for Indians. After lobbying by "Indian diplomats and prominent businessmen", the proposal was not carried through. An electronic pre-arrival notification required for Indian nationals was implemented in January 2017 instead.

Crime
In the perception some sectors of the press and political spectrum, asylum seekers are associated with a high level of street crime. Although crime data is not provided from the police, and from what little data can be obtained from Freedom of Information requests shows no evidence of an increase in refugee led crime in Hong Kong, and Hong Kong has one of the lowest crime rates in the world. Vision First, a refugee advocacy NGO, argues that criminal activity by asylum seekers is due to "Hong Kong’s botched asylum system" which provides "insufficient welfare assistance" and disallows working.

An alleged rape in June 2013 by an asylum seeker sparked alarm in Hong Kong and subjected the handling of asylum seekers by the city government to widespread public scrutiny. A 26-year-old Indian asylum seeker living in Rhine Guesthouse, a hostel at Chungking Mansions, allegedly raped another guest, a woman from mainland China.

Over the course of 2015, a series of arrests of 84 suspects busted a major drug ring operating in Hong Kong. Most of the suspects were described as mostly "African men, mainly from Gambia" who had sought asylum.

References

External links
UNHCR Hong Kong
Justice Centre Hong Kong
Christian Action

 
Politics of Hong Kong